Edward Michael may refer to:

 Edward S. Michael (1918–1994), United States Army Air Forces officer and Medal of Honor recipient
 Edward Salim Michael (1921–2006), composer of symphonic music